To All My Friends in Far-Flung Places is a 1994 album by the American musician Dave Van Ronk. He performed versions of songs written by people he knew. Van Ronk spent 18 months working on the album. Christine Lavin sang on To All My Friends in Far-Flung Places.

Reception

Writing for AllMusic, critic Bruce Eder praised the album and wrote: "Van Ronk does remarkably well with this material—he holds a tune less effectively than Dylan, but he also imparts a special rawness and seriousness to the songs, his voice overflowing with the sound of seemingly bitter experience... Not all of it works — his voice is sometimes way too rough even by folk-blues standards for what he's trying to do — but most of it is extremely valuable. And his cover of 'Soon My Work Will All Be Done' is one of Van Ronk's greatest performances ever."

Track listing

Disc one
"Subterranean Homesick Blues" (Bob Dylan)
"Where Were You Last Night" (Frank Christian)
"Simon Smith and the Amazing Dancing Bear" (Randy Newman)
"Ramblin' Boy" (Tom Paxton)
"My Name Joe" (David Massengill)
"Outside of a Small Circle of Friends" (Phil Ochs)
"Entering Marion" (John Forster)
"The Drinking Song" (Jack Hardy)
"Amoeba Hop" (Christine Lavin)
"Things " (Mitch Greenhill)
"Stone Sober Blues" (Paul Geremia)
"Joshua Gone Barbados" (Eric Von Schmidt)
"Soon My Work Will Be All Done" (Reverend Gary Davis)
"To All My Friends in Far Flung Places" (Jane Voss)

Disc two
"Wrap the World Around Your Finger" (Judy Mayhan)
"Jersey Girl" (Tom Waits)
"Punky's Dilema" (Paul Simon)
"I'm Hip" (Dave Frishberg, Bob Dorough)
"Harbour of Love" (Erik Frandsen, Michael Garin, Robert Hipkens, Paula Lockhart)
"Awful Kind of Blues" (Gary White, John F. Hammond)
"Why The Blues Don't Worry Me" (Steve James)
"A Sailor's Prayer"  (Rod MacDonald)
"Many a Mile" (Patrick Sky)
"Four Strong Winds" (Ian Tyson)
"The Simple Things We Said" (Les Choses Les Plus Simple)" (Gabriel Yacoub) (English Translation: Ellen Hinsey, Nikki Matheson, Gabriel Yacoub)
"Song to a Seagull" (Joni Mitchell)
"Heart on the Run" (Tom Intondi, Frank Rossini)
"All My Friends in Far Flung Places (Reprise)" (Jane Voss)

Personnel
Dave Van Ronk – vocals, guitar
Samuel Charters – background vocals, washboard, jug
Frank Christian – guitar, vocals
Dave Conrad – bass
Anne DeMarinis – accordion
Ada Dyer – background vocals
Bill Ferns – harmonica
Erik Frandsen – guitar, background vocals
Paul Geremia – guitar
Dakota Dave Hull – guitar
Keith Ingham – piano, organ
Arnie Kinsella – drums
Christine Lavin – background vocals
Chris Lowe – background vocals
Peri Lyons – background vocals
David Massengill – background vocals
Tom Paxton – background vocals
Britt Savage - background vocals
Jenny Schuessler – background vocals
Eve Silber – background vocals
Shelly Thompson – background vocals
Andrea Vuocolo – background vocals
Murray Wall – bass
Heather Wood – background vocals

Production notes
Produced by Samuel Charters
Engineered by Arthur Steuer and Steve Rosenthal
Photography by Samuel Charters and Nora Charters

References

1994 albums
Dave Van Ronk albums
albums produced by Samuel Charters